Ali-Akbar Shahnazi (12 May 1897 – 17 March 1985) was an Iranian musician and master of the tar.

Biography
Ostad Ali Akbar Shahnazi was born in Tehran, Iran in 1897. His father, Mirza Hossein Gholi, another master of tar, named him Ali Akbar according to a very old tradition: the grandson should be named as his grandfather. His younger brother Abdolhossein shahnazi was also a master of tar. 

He recorded many pieces with noted vocalists of his time such as Eghbal Azar and Nakisa. He collaborated with other masters of his time such as Reza Mahjubi (violinist) and Hosain Tehrani (father of modern tonbak). He not only taught his students his father's  radif collection, but also composed a beautiful radif. This he named radif-e-dore-ye-ali and taught it to his students too.

Shahnazi comes from a music family called in Persian Khandan-e-Honar, literally meaning "art dynasty". 

Shahnazi died in March 1985 at the age of 88.

References
Haghighat, A., Honarmandan e Irani az Aghaz ta Emrooz, Koomesh Publication, 2004, (in Persian)
Khaleghi, R., Sargozasht e Musighi e Iran, Ferdowsi Publication, 1955, (in Persian)

External links
A sample of his work

Iranian tar players
1897 births
1985 deaths
20th-century Iranian people